Fernando Javier Crosa (born 28 February 1979 in Rosario) is an Argentinian footballer who plays as a defender. He was part of the Argentina U-20 team that won the South American Youth Championship in 1999.

Playing career

Club
Crosa began his playing career with Newell's Old Boys in 1997, he made his league debut on 23 November in a 0–4 defeat in the Rosario derby. He went on to make 165 league appearances for Newell's, scoring 12 goals.

In 2003 Crosa joined River Plate where he was part of the squad that won the Clausra 2004 championship.

In 2005, he joined Colón de Santa Fe, he then had stints with Quilmes, Gimnasia (LP) and Talleres de Córdoba before joining Chacarita Juniors in July 2008.

International
Crosa played for the Argentina U-20 team in 1999, when they won the South American Youth Championship and played in the 1999 FIFA World Youth Championship. He also played for Argentina U-23 in 2000.

Titles
Argentina U-20
1999 South American Youth Championship:

River Plate
Primera División Argentina: Clausra 2004

References

External links

 Statistics at ESPN
 BDFA profile
 Argentine Primera statistics

1979 births
Living people
Footballers from Rosario, Santa Fe
Argentine footballers
Association football defenders
Newell's Old Boys footballers
Club Atlético River Plate footballers
Quilmes Atlético Club footballers
Club Atlético Colón footballers
Talleres de Córdoba footballers
Chacarita Juniors footballers
Argentine Primera División players
Argentina youth international footballers
Argentina under-20 international footballers